The 2016–17 Third Amateur Football League season was the 67th season of the Bulgarian Third Amateur Football League. The league is equivalent to the third level of the Bulgarian football pyramid, with a total of four divisions within it. The divisions themselves are geographically separated into Northwest, Northeast, Southeast, and Southwest. This was the first season following the 2016 reorganization of the Bulgarian football league system, which saw the emergence of new a competition format, including the First and Second Professional Football Leagues.

Changes from the 2015–16 season

Club Movements Between V Group and B Group
The champions of the four 2015–16 V AFG divisions gained promotion to the 2016–17 Second League: Chernomorets Balchik from V AFG Northeast and Nesebar from V AFG Southeast, Etar Veliko Tarnovo from V AFG Northwest and CSKA Sofia from V AFG Southwest.  Chernomorets Balchik refused to participate for financial reasons, while a new club CSKA Sofia was formed with the merger of Chavdar Etropole and Litex Lovech and was invited by the Bulgarian Football Union directly to the newly formed First League.

In return, four teams were relegated to the Third League: Dobrudzha Dobrich, Septemvri Simitli, Lokomotiv Mezdra and Litex Lovech II.

Club Movements Between V Group and the Regional Groups
 Northeast: Ticha Dolni Chiflik and Dve Mogili were relegated last season to regional divisions. Benkovski Byala, Himik Devnya and Shumen did not apply for participation. Dobrudzha Dobrich was relegated from B Group. Marisan Ruse merged with Ruse into Lokomotiv Ruse, while Inter Plachidol moved to Dobrich.  The new clubs promoted from the regional divisions were Spartak Varna, Dorostol Silistra and Hitrino.
 Northwest: Yantra Gabrovo, Botev Kozloduy and Gigant Belene were relegated from last season to regional divisions. Lokomotiv Mezdra, relegated from B Group last season, was not granted permission to participate due to unpaid dues to the Bulgarian Football Union.  The new clubs promoted from the regional divisions were Miziya Knezha and Kom Berkovitsa. Dunav 98 Selanovtsi merged with Botev Kozloduy into Parva Atomna Kozloduy, while Botev Lukovit merged with Litex Lovech into Litex Lovech.
 Southeast: Chernomorets Burgas and Sliven were relegated from last season to regional divisions, while Spartak Plovdiv resigned shortly before the start of the season. Levski Karlovo joined the Second League. The new clubs promoted from the regional divisions were Atletik Kuklen, Arda Kardzhali, Vereya II, Elhovo and Lyubimets. The latter took the place of Spartak Plovdiv.
 Southwest: Balkan Varvara and Lokomotiv Sofia relegated from last season to regional divisions. Vitosha Bistritsa and Septemvri Sofia joined the Second League.  Furthermore, Sofia 2010 merged into Tsarsko Selo and also joined the Second League. Septemvri Simitli was relegated from B Group.  The new clubs promoted from the regional divisions were Chavdar Etropole, Hebar Pazardzhik, Marek Dupnitsa, Svoboda Peshtera and Balkan Botevgrad. Malesh Mikrevo merged with Pirin Razlog to form Pirin Razlog (11th in B Group last season and subsequently merged with Septemvri Sofia); Chiko Byaga merged with Hebar Pazardzhik into Hebar Pazardzhik, and Pravets merged with Chavdar Etropole into Chavdar Etropole.

Northeast group

Stadia and locations

Regular season

Championship round

Relegation round

Southeast group

Stadia and locations

League table

Northwest group

Stadia and locations

League table

Southwest group

Stadia and locations

League table

References

Third Amateur Football League (Bulgaria) seasons
3
Bulgaria